A food group is a collection of foods that share similar nutritional properties or biological classifications. List of nutrition guides  typically divide foods into food groups and Recommended Dietary Allowance recommend daily servings of each group for a healthy diet. In the United States for instance, USDA has described food as being in from 4 to 11 different groups.

Historical food groups

The USDA promoted eight basic food groups prior to 1943, then seven basic food groups until 1956, then four food groups.  A food pyramid was introduced in 1992, then MyPyramid in 2005, followed by MyPlate in 2011.  Dietary guidelines were introduced in 2015 and slated to be rereleased every five years.  The 2020 guidelines were to be released in Spring 2020.

The most common food groups
 Dairy, also called milk products and sometimes categorized with milk alternatives or meat, is typically a smaller category in nutrition guides, if present at all, and is sometimes listed apart from other food groups. Examples of dairy products include milk, butter, ghee, yogurt, cheese, cream and ice cream. The categorization of dairy as a food group with recommended daily servings has been criticized by, for example, the Harvard School of Public Health who point out that "research has shown little benefit, and considerable potential for harm, of such high dairy intakes. Moderate consumption of milk or other dairy products—one to two servings a day—is fine, and likely has some benefits for children. But it’s not essential for adults, for a host of reasons."
 Fruits, sometimes categorized with vegetables, include apples, oranges, bananas, berries and lemons. Fruits contain carbohydrates, mostly in the form of sugar as well as important vitamins and minerals.
 Cereals and legumes, sometimes categorized as grains, is often the largest category in nutrition guides. Cereal examples include wheat, rice, oats, barley, bread and pasta. Legumes are also known as pulses and include beans, soy beans, lentils and chickpeas. Cereals are a good source of starch and are often categorized with other starchy food such as potatoes. Legumes are good source of essential amino acids as well as carbohydrates.
 Meat, sometimes labelled protein and occasionally inclusive of legumes and beans, eggs, meat analogues and/or dairy, is typically a medium- to smaller-sized category in nutrition guides. Examples include chicken, fish, turkey, pork and beef.
 Confections, also called sugary foods and sometimes categorized with fats and oils, is typically a very small category in nutrition guides, if present at all, and is sometimes listed apart from other food groups. Examples include candy, soft drinks, and chocolate. 
 Vegetables, sometimes categorized with fruit and occasionally inclusive of legumes, is typically a large category second only to grains, or sometimes equal or superior to grains, in nutrition guides. Examples include spinach, carrots, onions, and broccoli.
 Water is treated in very different ways by different food guides. Some exclude the category, others list it separately from other food groups, and yet others make it the center or foundation of the guide. Water is sometimes categorized with tea, fruit juice, vegetable juice and even soup, and is typically recommended in plentiful amounts.

Uncommon food groups
The number of "common" food groups varies depending on who is defining them. Canada's Food Guide, which has been in continual publication since 1942 and is the second most requested government document after the income tax form in Canada, recognizes only four official food groups, listing the remainder of foods as "another". Some of these "others" include:
Alcoholic beverage or Alcohol is listed apart from other food groups and recommended only for certain people in moderation by Harvard's Healthy Eating Pyramid and the University of Michigan's Healing Foods Pyramid, while Italy's food pyramid includes a half-serving of wine and beer.

See also
Table of food nutrients
Human nutrition

References

Nutrition